Fatou Ndiaye Sow (1937 – 24/25 October 2004) was a Senegalese poet, teacher and children's writer. Many of her books were about children's rights and were published with the support of UNICEF and the Senegalese government. In 1989, she participated in the 5th PEN International Congress.

Writing
Her books include:
 Fleurs du Sahel Nouvelles Editions Africaines du Sénégal (1990), 
 Takam-Tikou (j'ai deviné) (N.E.I., 1997)
 Comme Rama, je veux aller à l’école Nouvelles Editions Africaines du Sénégal (2003)  - see

Further reading
 Véronique Tadjo, Talking Drums: A Selection of Poems from Africa south of the Sahara, Bloomsbury USA Children's Books (2004), .

References

External links
 University of Western Australia
 ÉCRIVAINS SÉNÉGALAIS - in French
 Agence de Presse Sénégalaise, 2004 - in French
 Hommage à Fatou NDIAYE SOW : La mère de l’Aes, racontée par ses compères, Rewmi.com

Senegalese women writers
Senegalese women children's writers
2004 deaths
1956 births
Senegalese poets
Senegalese women poets
20th-century poets
20th-century women writers